The 2018 Khabarovsk Krai gubernatorial election was held in September 2018. The first round was held on 9 September, on common election day, with none of the candidates gaining an absolute majority (50% + 1 vote), causing a run-off vote.

The second round was held on 23 September, between the top two candidates, the Liberal Democratic candidate Sergei Furgal and the incumbent Governor Vyacheslav Shport, nominated by the United Russia. Both of them scored 35% of the vote in the first round. In the second round, Sergei Furgal was elected Governor of Khabarovsk Krai with 69.57% of the vote.

Background
Vyacheslav Shport became acting Governor of Khabarovsk Krai on 30 April 2009 after Governor Viktor Ishayev was appointed as Presidential Envoy to the Far Eastern Federal District by President Dmitry Medvedev. Shport previously served as Deputy Chairman of the Government of Khabarovsk Krai - Minister of Industry, Transportation, and Communications (since 2009) and Member of the State Duma (2000-2007). On 6 May 2009 Vyacheslav Shport was confirmed as Governor by the Legislative Duma of Khabarovsk Krai for a four-year term. In December 2010 the Legislative Duma extended Governor's term to 5 years.

Governor Shport's first term expired on 30 April 2013 but he was reappointed by President Vladimir Putin as acting Governor until the September gubernatorial election. Vyacheslav Shport won 2013 election with 63.92% of the vote, State Duma member Sergei Furgal (LDPR) came second with 19.14%.

Candidates
Only political parties can nominate candidates for gubernatorial election in Khabarovsk Krai, self-nomination is not possible. However, candidate is not obliged to be a member of the nominating party. Candidate for Governor of Khabarovsk Krai should be a Russian citizen and at least 30 years old. Each candidate in order to be registered is required to collect at least 8% of signatures of members and heads of municipalities (191-200 signatures). Also gubernatorial candidates present 3 candidacies to the Federation Council and election winner later appoints one of the presented candidates.

Registered candidates
Five candidates were registered to participate in the election

Candidates for the Federation Council
Igor Glukhov (A Just Russia):
Aleksandr Danilin, pensioner
Maria Yermilova, chair of the "Center for Protection of Citizens' Rights" regional office
Mikhail Molokoyedov, general director of LLC "Siyanie"
Andrey Petrov (The Greens):
Aleksey Gots, individual entrepreneur
Viktor Saykov, chair of The Greens regional office
Vyacheslav Sklyarov, chair of the regional Union of Gardeners
Anastasia Salamakha (CPRF):
Aleksandr Gromov, member of the Khabarovsk Krai Legislative Duma
Viktor Postnikov, member of the Khabarovsk Krai Legislative Duma, 2013 gubernatorial candidate
Anatoly Romantsov, first secretary of CPRF Zheleznodorozhny district office
Sergei Furgal (LDPR):
Yelena Greshnyakova, member of the Khabarovsk Krai Legislative Duma
Sergey Olnev, psychiatrist
Alla Shpareychuk, aide to Sergei Furgal
Vyacheslav Shport (United Russia):
Natalya Lyashko, deputy director of Khabarovsk Krai Children's Library
Yury Plesovskikh, acting rector of Khabarovsk State University of Economics and Law
Aleksandr Shishkin, incumbent Member of the Federation Council

Polls

Exit polls

Results

In an upset State Duma member Sergei Furgal defeated incumbent Governor Vyacheslav Shport in the first round of voting by a slim margin of 0.19 points. Shport and Head of Khakassia Viktor Zimin were the first sitting governors who lost the first round since the re-introduction of gubernatorial elections in 2012. Shport's defeat came from increasing unpopularity of ruling United Russia party as the result of the pension reform, incumbent regional government also was very unpopular due to mismanagement and deteriorating financial situation.

After the first round Vyacheslav Shport tried to consolidate his support inviting Sergei Furgal to join his administration as First Vice-Governor, Furgal accepted the offer but declined to withdraw from the race. Former mayor of Khabarovsk Aleksandr Sokolov also received an invitation to join Khabarovsk Krai Government. Governor Shport tried to quickly solve problems, for example, sacking Komsomolsk-on-Amur mayor Andrey Klimov for his ineffective work.

However, Vyacheslav Shport still lost the run-off to Sergei Furgal by more than 40 points. Shport won only 2 municipalities in the second round compared to 13 in the first round.

After the election newly elected Governor Sergei Furgal appointed member of Khabarovsk Krai Legislative Duma Yelena Greshnyakova as Member of the Federation Council.

References

Khabarovsk Krai
September 2018 events in Russia
Politics of Khabarovsk Krai